Latent iron deficiency (LID), also called iron-deficient erythropoiesis, is a medical condition in which there is evidence of iron deficiency without anemia (normal hemoglobin level). It is important to assess this condition because individuals with latent iron deficiency may develop iron-deficiency anemia. Additionally, there is some evidence of a decrease in vitality and an increase in fatigue among individuals with LID.

Diagnosis

Diagnostic tests for latent iron deficiency LID 
 complete blood count
 hemoglobin
 serum iron
 total iron binding capacity
 serum ferritin
 bone marrow examination (rarely)
Note: Iron therapy must be suspended 48 hours beforehand to ensure valid test results.

The normal range for hemoglobin is 13.8 to 17.2 grams per deciliter (g/dL) for men and 12.1 to 15.1 g/dL for women. Low hemoglobin indicates anemia but will be normal for LID.

Normal serum iron is between 60 and 170 micrograms per deciliter (μg/dL). Normal total iron-binding capacity for both sexes is 240 to 450 μg/dL. Total iron-binding capacity increases when iron deficiency exists.

Serum ferritin levels reflect the iron stores available in the body. The normal range is 20 to 200 ng/mL for men and 15 to 150 ng/mL for women. Low levels (< 12 ng/mL) are specific for iron deficiency. However, inflammatory and neoplastic disorders can cause ferritin levels to increase – this may be seen in cases of hepatitis, leukemia, Hodgkin lymphoma, and GI tract tumors.

The most sensitive and specific criterion for iron-deficient erythropoiesis is depleted iron stores in the bone marrow. However, in practice, a bone marrow examination is rarely needed.

Interpretation of diagnostic test results in terms of stage of iron deficiency 
LID is present in stage 1 and 2, before anemia occurs in stage 3. These first two stages can be interpreted as depletion of iron stores and reduction of effective iron transport.

Stage 1 is characterized by loss of bone marrow iron stores while hemoglobin and serum iron levels remain normal. Serum ferritin falls to less than 20 ng/mL. Increased iron absorption, a compensatory change, results in an increased amount of transferrin and consequent increased iron-binding capacity.

Stage 2 – Erythropoiesis is impaired. In spite of an increased level of transferrin, serum iron level is decreased along with transferrin saturation. Erythropoiesis impairment begins when the serum iron level falls to less than 50 μg/dL and transferrin saturation is less than 16%.

In stage 3, anemia (reduced hemoglobin levels) is present but red blood cell appearance remains normal.

Changes in the appearance of red blood cells are the hallmark of stage 4; first microcytosis and then hypochromia develop.

Iron deficiency begins to affect tissues in stage 5, manifesting as symptoms and signs.

Treatment 

There is no consensus on how to treat LID but one option is to treat it as an iron-deficiency anemia with ferrous sulfate (Iron(II) sulfate) at a dose of 100 mg x day in two doses (one at breakfast and the other at dinner) or 3 mg x Kg x day in children (also in two doses) for two or three months. The ideal is to increase the body's iron deposits, measured as levels of ferritin in serum, with the aim of reaching a ferritin value between 30 and 100 ng/mL. Another clinical study has shown an increase in ferritin levels in those taking iron compared with others receiving a placebo from persons with LID. With ferritin levels higher than 100 ng/mL an increase in infections has been reported. Another way to treat LID is with an iron-rich diet and additionally ascorbic acid or vitamin C, contained in many types of fruits as oranges, kiwifruits, etc. which will increase iron absorption 2 to 5-fold.

Epidemiology 

Many studies have been done on LID; its frequency varies according to country of origin, diet, pregnancy status age, gender, etc. Depending on these previous conditions, the frequency can vary from 11% in male athletes (Poland) to 44.7% in children less than one year old (China):

Frequency of LID in different countries and populations:
 Poland: 14 of LID (11%) in 131 male athletes  and 31 of ID (26%) in 121 female athletes
 India: 27.5% of LID amongst student nurses
 Spain: 14.7% of LID in 211 women of child-bearing age in Barcelona
 China: In 3591 pregnant and 3721 premenopausal women from 15 provinces. It was found: LID 42.6% in pregnant women (urban first-trimester 41.9%) (rural 36.1%) while 34.4% of LID in premenopausal non-pregnant women (urban 35.6%)(rural 32.4%). Pediatric samples: In 9118 children from 31 provinces aged 7 months to 7 years, the global incidence of LID in children was 32.5%. Sub-classifying the cases according to age and origin (global/countryside): less than 1 y (7m to 12m) LID 44.7% (35.8% in countryside), 1 – 3 years LID 35.9% (31% in countryside), 4 to 7 years (LID 26.5%) (30.1% in countryside).

References

External links 

Mineral deficiencies
Deficiency
Red blood cell disorders